Aibhilín is the Irish form of the Norman name Aveline (anglicized Evelyn).

Bearers of the name
 Aibhilín Ní Uidhir, died 1498
 Aibhilín Ní Neill, died 1508
 Aibhilín Ní Uiginn, 1510
 Aibhilín Ní Ridire an Glenna, died 1524
 Aibhilín Ní Domhnaill, died 1549
 Aibhilín Níc Carthaigh, died 1560
 Aibhilín Ní Roste, died 1583

See also
List of Irish-language given names

References

External links
 
 

Irish-language feminine given names